"Close Your Eyes" is a popular song written by American composer Bernice Petkere. The song was published in 1933 and first recorded that year by Freddy Martin & His Orchestra.

Recorded versions
  
Ruth Etting (1933)  
Al Bowlly (1933)
Comedian Harmonists (1934), German version (as "Komm im Traum")
Johnny Bode (1934), Swedish version
Harry Belafonte (1949)
Tony Bennett (1954)
Humphrey Lyttelton (1956)
Ella Fitzgerald (1957)
Oscar Peterson (1959)
Gene Ammons  (1960) - Boss Tenor
Vic Damone - Linger Awhile, My Baby Loves To Swing (1962)
Michel Legrand (1962) "Bravissimo" album
Doris Day (1957) - Day By Night, & Duet (1962)
Peggy Lee (1963)
Nancy Wilson (1964)
Herb Ellis & Remo Palmier (1978) "Windflower" album
Toni Tennille (1988) "Do It Again" album
Kurt Elling (1995)
Liza Minnelli (1996)
Betty Carter (1996)
Stacey Kent (1997) - Close Your Eyes
Don Tiki (1997)
Queen Latifah (2004)
Terez Montcalm (2007)
Loston Harris (2008)
Nellie McKay (2009)
Roy Hargrove (2012) ?
Alexis Cole (2013)
Liv Stoveland (2010)
Leonardo Zurita (2021)

In popular culture
The song is featured in the film The Abominable Dr. Phibes (1971), during a murder scene, and in the 1996 BBC TV detective series The Mrs Bradley Mysteries, which starred Diana Rigg. The song was the end of transmission tune of Radio MonteCarlo in the 1960s.

References

External links
 Song lyric

Pop standards
1933 songs
Liza Minnelli songs
1930s jazz standards
Al Bowlly songs